Adewale Oluwafemi Sapara (born 27 January 1995) is a Nigerian professional footballer who plays as a left winger for Portuguese club Farense on loan from Portimonense.

Career 
Sapara started with a third division side when he arrived Portugal in the 2018/2019 season. He was adjudged the most valuable player in the division in his first stint. 

He would follow that dazzling season with another, with a promotion to the second division with Leixões.

Leixões SC
On 1 July 2020, Sapara signed a contract with Leixões in the Liga Sabseg. 
 
At Leixões, Sapara was six times voted MVP in the course of the season and also emerged his club’s highest goal scorer.

Portimonese S.C.
On 31 January 2022, Sapara moved to Portimonense in the Liga Bwin.

References

External links 

1995 births
Living people
Nigerian footballers
Association football wingers
Portimonense S.C. players
Leixões S.C. players
S.C. Farense players
Sportspeople from Lagos

Nigerian expatriate sportspeople in Portugal